Rocky Mountain Chocolate Factory is an international franchiser, confectionery manufacturer and retail operator in the United States, with outlets in South Korea, Panama, the Philippines, and the United Arab Emirates. The company is based in the town of Durango, Colorado.

The company manufactures chocolate candies and other confections in its  factory to supply its franchise locations. The factory produces approximately 300 chocolate candies and other confectionery products. These products include many varieties of clusters, caramels, creams, meltaways, truffles and molded chocolates.

The company has been publicly traded on the NASDAQ exchange since 1985 under the symbol "RMCF".

History
The company was founded by Frank Crail with his friends Jim Hilton and Mark Lipinski. They opened their first store on May 23, 1981, on Main Avenue. In 1982, both Hilton and Lipinski left the business, selling their interests to Crail. An offsite factory was built that same year with the company also opening their first franchises, one in Colorado Springs, Colorado and one in Park City, Utah.

In 2013, Kellogg's in the United States partnered with the Rocky Mountain Chocolate Factory to release a cereal under the latter's brand which consists of sweetened corn flakes, almond slices, and chocolate pieces. After a brief test run, Kellogg's expanded the limited edition cereal nationwide in 2014, discontinuing it in 2015.

In 2022 Rocky Mountain Chocolate Factory was named America's Best Chocolate and Candy Store by Newsweek.

References

External links
 

American chocolate companies
Confectionery companies of the United States
Colorado culture
Companies based in Durango, Colorado
Food and drink companies established in 1981
Food and drink companies based in Colorado
Companies listed on the Nasdaq